Sagin may refer to:

Sagin, Iran, a village in Kerman Province, Iran
Sağın, Karakoçan